Winchester is a neighborhood of San Jose, California, located in West San Jose.

History
Winchester gains its name from early resident Sarah Lockwood Winchester, a Connecticut native and heiress to fifty percent ownership of the Winchester Repeating Arms Company, who built the famous Winchester Mystery House nearby.

Geography
Winchester is bound to the west by the San Tomas Expressway and to the east by CA Highway 17. Its northern boundary is formed by the Junípero Serra Freeway (CA 280), while it borders the city of Campbell to its south, roughly just north of Hamilton Avenue.

External links
Winchester; San Jose Strong Neighborhoods Initiative, June 23, 2006; url accessed August 25, 2006.

Neighborhoods in San Jose, California